Christopher Reitz (born 3 April 1973 in Frankfurt am Main, Hessen) is a German field hockey goalkeeper, who represented Germany in the 1992, 1996 and 2000 Summer Olympics. He is now an orthopaedic surgeon in Sydney, Australia.

International Senior Tournaments
 1992 – Summer Olympics, Barcelona (1st place)
 1994 – Champions Trophy, Lahore (2nd place)
 1994 – Hockey World Cup, Sydney (4th place)
 1995 – European Nations Cup, Dublin (1st place)
 1995 – Champions Trophy, Berlin (1st place)
 1996 – Summer Olympics, Atlanta (4th place)
 1996 – Champions Trophy, Madras (3rd place)
 1997 – Champions Trophy, Adelaide (1st place)
 1998 – World Hockey Cup, Utrecht (3rd place)
 1998 – Champions Trophy, Lahore (6th place)
 1999 – European Indoor Nations Cup, Slagelse (1st place)
 1999 – European Nations Cup, Padova (1st place)
 2000 – Champions Trophy, Amstelveen (2nd place)
 2000 – Summer Olympics, Sydney (5th place)
 2001 – Champions Trophy, Rotterdam (1st place)

External links
 

1973 births
Field hockey players at the 1992 Summer Olympics
Field hockey players at the 1996 Summer Olympics
Field hockey players at the 2000 Summer Olympics
German male field hockey players
Olympic field hockey players of Germany
Olympic gold medalists for Germany
Living people
Olympic medalists in field hockey
Medalists at the 1992 Summer Olympics
1998 Men's Hockey World Cup players
Male field hockey goalkeepers
Sportspeople from Frankfurt
20th-century German people
21st-century German people